The 1995 NCAA Division I Women's Tennis Championships were the 14th annual championships to determine the national champions of NCAA Division I women's singles, doubles, and team collegiate tennis in the United States, held during May 1995 in Malibu, California.

Texas defeated Florida in the team championship, 5–4, to claim their second national title.

Host
This year's tournaments were hosted by Pepperdine University at the Ralphs-Straus Tennis Center in Malibu, California. This was the first time the Waves hosted the women's championships.

The men's and women's NCAA tennis championships would not be held jointly until 2006.

Team tournament

See also
NCAA Division II Tennis Championships (Men, Women)
NCAA Division III Tennis Championships (Men, Women)

References

External links
List of NCAA Women's Tennis Champions

NCAA Division I tennis championships
NCAA Division I Women's Tennis Championships
NCAA Division I Women's Tennis Championships
NCAA Division I Women's Tennis Championships